Edgar Yipsel Harburg (born Isidore Hochberg; April 8, 1896 – March 5, 1981) was an American popular song lyricist and librettist who worked with many well-known composers. He wrote the lyrics to the standards "Brother, Can You Spare a Dime?" (with Jay Gorney), "April in Paris", and "It's Only a Paper Moon", as well as all of the songs for the film The Wizard of Oz, including "Over the Rainbow".  He was known for the social commentary of his lyrics, as well as his leftist leanings. He championed racial and gender equality and union politics.  He also was an ardent critic of religion.

Early life and career
Harburg, the youngest of four surviving children (out of ten), was born Isidore Hochberg on the Lower East Side of New York City on April 8, 1896. His parents, Lewis Hochberg and Mary Ricing, were Yiddish-speaking Orthodox Jews who had emigrated from Russia.

He later adopted the name Edgar Harburg, and came to be best known as Edgar "Yip" Harburg. He attended Townsend Harris High School, where he and Ira Gershwin, who bonded over a shared fondness for Gilbert and Sullivan, worked on the school paper and became lifelong friends. According to his son Ernie Harburg, Gilbert and Irish dramatist George Bernard Shaw taught his father, a "democratic socialist, [and] sworn challenger of all tyranny against the people, that 'humor is an act of courage' and dissent".

After World War I, Harburg returned to New York and graduated from City College (later part of the City University of New York), which Ira Gershwin had initially attended with him, in 1921. After Harburg married and had two children, he started writing light verse for local newspapers. He became a co-owner of Consolidated Electrical Appliance Company, but the company went bankrupt following the crash of 1929, leaving Harburg "anywhere from $50,000 – $70,000 in debt," which he insisted on paying back over the course of the next few decades. At this point, Harburg and Ira Gershwin agreed that Harburg should start writing song lyrics.

Gershwin introduced Harburg to Jay Gorney, who collaborated with him on songs for an Earl Carroll Broadway review (Earl Carroll's Sketchbook): the show was successful and Harburg was engaged as lyricist for a series of successful revues, including Americana in 1932, for which he wrote the lyrics of "Brother, Can You Spare a Dime?" to the tune of a lullaby Gorney had learned as a child in Russia. This song swept the nation, becoming an anthem of the Great Depression.

Harburg was a staunch critic of religion. He wrote a poem entitled "Atheist" that summarized his views on God.

Hollywood and Broadway
Harburg and Gorney were offered a contract with Paramount: in Hollywood, Harburg worked with composers Harold Arlen, Vernon Duke, Jerome Kern, Jule Styne, and Burton Lane, and later wrote the lyrics for The Wizard of Oz, one of the earliest known "integrated musicals," for which he won the Academy Award for Best Music, Original Song for "Over the Rainbow."

Of his work on The Wizard of Oz, his son (and biographer) Ernie Harburg has said:

Working in Hollywood did not stop Harburg's career on Broadway. In the 1940s, he wrote a series of "book" musicals with social messages, including the successful Bloomer Girl (1944), set during the Civil War, which was about temperance and  women's rights activist Amelia Bloomer, and which celebrated equality for women, Abolitionism, and the Underground Railroad. Harburg's best known Broadway show, Finian's Rainbow (1947) was, in its original production, possibly the first Broadway musical with a racially integrated chorus line, and features his "When the Idle Poor Become the Idle Rich." Its plot satirized American financial practices and criticized reactionist politicians, mistreatment of the working classes as well as racism and the Jim Crow laws. It was made into a film in 1968 starring Fred Astaire and Petula Clark, directed by Francis Ford Coppola.

Blacklisting
Although never a member of the Communist Party (he was a member of the Socialist Party, and joked that "Yip" referred to the Young People's Socialist League, nicknamed the "Yipsels") he had been involved in radical groups, and he was blacklisted.

Harburg was named in a pamphlet Red Channels: The Report of Communist Influence in Radio and Television; his involvement with the Hollywood Democratic Committee, and his refusal to identify reputed communists, led to him being blocked from working in Hollywood films, television, and radio for twelve full years, from 1950 to 1962. "As the writer of the lyric of the song 'God's Country', I am outraged by the suggestion that somehow I am connected with, believe in, or am sympathetic with Communist or totalitarian philosophy", he wrote to the House Un-American Activities Committee in 1950. He was unable to travel abroad during this period, as his passport had been revoked. With a score by Sammy Fain and Harburg's lyrics, the musical Flahooley (1951) satirized the country's anti-communist sentiment, but it closed after forty performances at the Broadhurst Theatre on Broadway. The New York critics were dismissive of the show, although it had been a success during its earlier pre-Broadway run in Philadelphia.

Later career
In 1966, songwriter Earl Robinson sought Harburg's help for the song "Hurry Sundown"; the two collaborated on the song and are credited as co-writers. The song was intended for the film Hurry Sundown, but was not used in the film. It was, however, recorded by Peter, Paul and Mary for their 1966 album The Peter, Paul and Mary Album. The song was released as a single in 1967, and reached No. 37 on the Billboard Easy Listening chart. It was also nominated for the Grammy Award for Best Folk Recording.

Death
Harburg died while driving on Sunset Boulevard in Los Angeles on March 5, 1981, at the age of 84. While he was initially reported to have been killed in a traffic accident, it was later determined that he suffered a heart attack while stopped at a red light.

Awards and recognition
In 1940 Harburg won an Oscar, shared with Harold Arlen, for Best Music, Original Song
for The Wizard of Oz (1939). In addition, he was nominated for an Oscar for Best Music, Original Song, along with Arlen,
for Cabin in the Sky, (1943) and Best Music, Original Song
for Can't Help Singing, shared with Jerome Kern in (1944).

Harburg was inducted into the Songwriters Hall of Fame in 1972.

On March 7, 2001, the results of a poll conducted by the Recording Industry Association of America and the National Endowment for the Humanities ranked Judy Garland's rendition of "Over the Rainbow" as the Number One recording of the 20th century.

On June 22, 2004, the American Film Institute broadcast AFI's 100 Years ... 100 Songs, a TV special announcing the 100 greatest film songs. "Over the Rainbow" was Number One, and "Ding-Dong! The Witch Is Dead" was Number 82.

In April 2005, the United States Postal Service issued a commemorative stamp recognizing Harburg's accomplishments.  The stamp was drawn from a portrait taken by photographer Barbara Bordnick in 1978 along with a rainbow and lyric from "Over the Rainbow".  The first day ceremony was held at the 92nd Street Y in New York.

Songs
"Brother, Can You Spare a Dime?" with composer Jay Gorney (1932)
"Riddle Me This" with composer Lewis Gensler (from the revue, "Ballyhoo of 1932", 1932)
"How Do You Do It? with composer Lewis Gensler (as above, 1932)
"April in Paris" with Vernon Duke (1932)
"It's Only a Paper Moon" with Harold Arlen (1933)
"Then I'll Be Tired of You" with Arthur Schwartz (1934)
"Last Night When We Were Young" with composer Harold Arlen (1935)
"Down with Love" with Harold Arlen (1937)
"Over the Rainbow" with Harold Arlen (1939)
"We're Off to See the Wizard" with Harold Arlen (1939)
"Lydia the Tattooed Lady" with Harold Arlen (1939)
"Happiness Is a Thing Called Joe" with Harold Arlen (1943)
"Salome" with Roger Edens (1943) (for the movie Du Barry Was a Lady)
"The Eagle and Me" with Harold Arlen (1944)
"How Are Things in Glocca Morra?" with Burton Lane (1946)
"Old Devil Moon" with Burton Lane (1947)
"When the Idle Poor Become the Idle Rich" with Burton Lane  (1947)
"Free and Equal Blues" performed by Josh White
"And Russia Was Her Name" with Jerome Kern (1943)

Broadway revues
Earl Carroll's Sketchbook of 1929 (1929) - co-composer and co-lyricist with Jay Gorney
Garrick Gaieties (1930) - contributing lyricist
Earl Carroll's Vanities of 1930 (1930) - contributing songwriter
The Vanderbilt Revue (1930) - contributing lyricist
Ziegfeld Follies of 1931 (1931) - featured lyricist for "Mailu"
Shoot the Works (1931) - contributing composer and lyricist
Ballyhoo of 1932 (1932) - lyricist
Americana (1932) - lyricist.  The Revue include "Brother Can You Spare a Dime?"
Walk A Little Faster (1932) - lyricist
Ziegfeld Follies of 1934 (1934) - primary lyricist (for about half of the numbers)
Life Begins at 8:40 (1934) - co-lyricist with Ira Gershwin
The Show is On (1936) - featured lyricist
Blue Holiday (1945) - all-Black cast - contributing composer and lyricist
At Home With Ethel Waters (1953) - featured lyricist for "Happiness is a Thing Called Joe"

Post-retirement or posthumous credits:
A Day in Hollywood / A Night in the Ukraine (1980) - featured lyricist for "Over the Rainbow"
Jerome Kern Goes to Hollywood (1986) - featured lyricist to music by Jerome Kern
Mostly Sondheim (2002) - featured lyricist

Broadway musicals
Hooray for What! (1937) - lyricist and originator
Hold On to Your Hats (1940) - lyricist
Bloomer Girl (1944) - lyricist, originator and director for musical numbers
Finian's Rainbow (1947) - lyricist, originator and co-bookwriter
Revived in 1955, 1960, 2009
Flahooley (1951) - lyricist, originator and co-bookwriter
Jamaica (1957) - lyricist, originator and co-bookwriter - Tony Nomination for Best Musical
The Happiest Girl in the World (1961) - originator and lyricist to music by Jacques Offenbach and originator of the story, based on Lysistrata by Aristophanes
Darling of the Day (1968) - lyricist

Films
Moonlight and Pretzels (1933)
The Singing Kid (1936)
Gold Diggers of 1937 (1936)
The Wizard of Oz (1939)
At the Circus (1939)
Babes on Broadway (1941)
Ship Ahoy (1942)
Cabin in the Sky (1943) (Harburg's song "Aint It The Truth", expressing religious skepticism, was removed)
Can't Help Singing (1944)
Gay Purr-ee (1962)
Finian's Rainbow (1968)

Books
Rhymes for the Irreverent (1965)
At This Point in Rhyme (1976)

References

Further reading

Meyerson, Harold and Ernie Harburg. Who Put the Rainbow in the Wizard of Oz: Yip Harburg, Lyricist, University of Michigan Press, (1993). 
Alonso, Harriet. "Yip Harburg: Legendary Lyricist and Human Rights Activist," Wesleyan University Press (2012).

External links

The Yip Harburg Foundation website
Biography of Harburg from USPS
"A Tribute to Yip Harburg: The Man Who Put the Rainbow in The Wizard of Oz", a Democracy Now! special, including audio/video clips of Yip Harburg, and an extended interview with his son and biographer, Ernie Harburg (video, audio, and print transcript)

E. Y. Harburg papers (first installment) and E. Y. Harburg papers (second installment) held by the Billy Rose Theatre Division, New York Public Library for the Performing Arts
E. Y. Harburg scores (his personal collection), held in the Music Division of the New York Public Library for the Performing Arts

Celebrated Lyricist Yip Harburg's Rhymes For The Irreverent Released February 2, 2006, article on The Freedom From Religion Foundation's website
April 29, 2006 - Somewhere Over the Rainbow . . . Rhymes for the Irreverent Freedom From Religion Foundation's Podcast
Over The Rainbow With Yip Harburg (BBC Radio 4 programme)
The Man Who Put the Rainbow in The Wizard of Oz by Amy Goodman
1920 passport photo of Yip Harburg(courtesy of the puzzlemaster, flickr.com)
Yip Harburg - Over The Rainbow
Yip Harburg - Brother, Can You Spare A Dime?
 E. Y. Harburg recordings at the Discography of American Historical Recordings.

1896 births
1981 deaths
20th-century American musicians
American musical theatre lyricists
American people of Russian-Jewish descent
American socialists
Best Original Song Academy Award-winning songwriters
Broadway composers and lyricists
Burials at sea
City College of New York alumni
Hollywood blacklist
Jewish American atheists
Jewish American songwriters
Jewish American writers
Jewish socialists
People from the Lower East Side
Townsend Harris High School alumni